Polar Bear is a narrow-gauge steam locomotive built in 1905 by W. G. Bagnall for the Groudle Glen Railway. It is now preserved and runs on the Amberley Museum Railway.

Groudle Glen Railway 

The Groudle Glen Railway on the Isle of Man is a  gauge tourist railway opened in 1896. It was originally worked by a single locomotive supplied by W.G. Bagnall, called Sea Lion. The railway proved popular, and in 1905 a second, slightly larger version of the same design was ordered from Bagnall. This locomotive was named Polar Bear. From 1905 onwards, Sea Lion and Polar Bear worked all the trains on the railway.

The railway was closed between 1915 and 1918. The two Bagnalls were taken out of service in the 1920s, when they were replaced by a pair of battery locomotives. The electric locomotives quickly wore out, and Polar Bear and Sea Lion were returned to traffic. The railway was closed for the duration of World War II and, when the line reopened in the late 1940s, only Polar Bear was returned to traffic. The Groudle Glen Railway closed in 1962.

Preservation 

Polar Bear was sold to the Brockham Museum Trust in 1967.  In 1982 it passed, with the rest of the Brockham collection, to the Amberley Museum Railway, where it was returned to traffic in 1983. Polar Bear'''s boiler was condemned around 1988, returning to service with a new boiler in 1993. Its boiler certificate expired at the end of 2010; with a retube and work on the firebox being required before a return to service.  Since being based at Amberley, Polar Bear has returned to the Groudle Glen on three occasions (1993, 1996 and 2005) to visit.Polar Bear was stripped down for overhaul in early 2011.  The boiler was moved to Chatham for overhaul, with mechanical work being undertaken in-house at Amberley.  The boiler was returned to Amberley in January 2012.  Polar Bear was relaunched on 13 July 2013 by BBC newsreader and railway enthusiast Nicholas Owen.

Polar Bear made its fourth visit to the Groudle Glen Railway since it was preserved in late July 2016. After its two week stay there, it returned home to Amberley museum.

 Brown Bear 
In January 2013 the Groudle Glen Railway announced a plan to construct a new locomotive to be named Brown Bear. Brown Bear will be built using the original Bagnall drawings for Polar Bear (Works No. 1781 of 1905) which have largely survived. Once the locomotive is complete it will operate alongside its older sister Sea Lion, allowing the railway to accurately represent period from 1905 through until the outbreak of the Second World War when these diminutive locomotives would have been in service together daily during the busy summer months.Polar Bear was an updated and more powerful version of Sea Lion incorporating a number of modifications. Some of these, such as the change from Baguley's modified valve gear to Bagnall Price gear, can be put down to changes in key personnel at W. G. Bagnall's; others, such as the larger diameter cylinders, increased grate area and increased driving wheel diameter were probably specified in light of nine years experience with Sea Lion in service.  The most obvious visible difference between the two locomotives of course is the change from round to rectangular spectacle plates in the front cab sheet which improved the forward vision for the driver.

As Polar Bear was the last locomotive ordered by the original railway company and is arguably a more advanced design, Brown Bear will be built as close to Polar Bear'''s design as modern manufacturing techniques will allow.  The original locomotives made extensive use of cast components, and while the new build will use castings where patterns are already available, some one-off components will be fabricated.

Working on the assumption that major components will be manufactured off site by a series of specialist firms before coming together for final assembly at Groudle the total cost of the build is expected to be in the region of £50,000.00 with completion expected within five years.

References 

Groudle Glen Railway
Preserved narrow gauge steam locomotives of Great Britain
2 ft gauge locomotives
Individual locomotives of Great Britain